Carlo Mastrangelo (October 5, 1937 – April 4, 2016) was an American doo-wop and progressive rock singer. Born and raised in The Bronx, he lived in an apartment on the corner of 179th St. and Mapes Ave.

He was an original member of The Belmonts (with and without Dion DiMucci), a popular singing group of the late 1950s and early 1960s. He led the progressive rock/jazz ensemble, "Pulse", during the 1970s.

Early career
Mastrangelo sang bass during the period that the group was known as Dion and the Belmonts. After the group's breakup with DiMucci, he sang lead vocals on all Belmonts recordings until leaving for a solo career in 1962. Following the hit, "Come On Little Angel", a split developed within the group concerning the finances of their privately owned label, Sabina (a.k.a. Sabrina) Records. Mastrangelo said, "Because we owned the company, we had to pay the bills, studio time, ads, and stuff like that. We needed hits that sold around 500,000 copies to make enough. That was the worst move we ever made. If we hadn't done that, we would have been together all these years. It was very sad, like leaving my two brothers".

Mastrangelo left the group and attempted a solo career on Laurie Records, releasing four singles under the name Carlo. He was backed vocally by the uncredited Tremonts (aka The Demilles). The singles, "Baby Doll", and "Little Orphan Girl", received considerable airplay in Florida and a few other states, but didn't make the national charts. "Ring-A-Ling", a tune which he overdubbed catchy bass vocals to, was a favorite of New York disc jockey Murray the K. He featured it on his weekly, "Record Review Board Contest", February 12, 1964, and it was the clear winner. It received airplay on New York stations WINS and WENE, but also failed to chart nationally. Around the same time, he contributed backing bass vocals to the Laurie single, "Donna Lee", by the Demilles, before joining DiMucci again.

Between 1964 and 1966 Mastrangelo was Dion DiMucci's occasional songwriting partner, backup vocalist, and drummer in the group, "Dion and the Wanderers". Recording for Columbia Records, they released three uncharted singles and made national appearances on Dick Clark's, "Where The Action Is", and "The Lloyd Thaxton Show".

In late 1966, the three original Belmonts; Mastrangelo, Milano, and D'Aleo, reunited with DiMucci and released the album, "Dion & The Belmonts Together Again", for ABC Records. Produced by "DiMont Music", Mastrangelo played drums and DiMucci contributed guitar to reduce the need for additional session musicians. Two singles were released from the LP; "My Girl The Month of May"/"Berimbau", and "Movin' Man"/"For Bobbie".

Neither charted in the United States, but fared better in England. During their brief reunion they appeared on the popular "Clay Cole Show" debuting "Berimbau" and "My Girl The Month of May", and occasionally performed at local New York City clubs such as "The Mardi Gras" on Staten Island (April 29, 1967) before disbanding.

Later career

In the late 1960s, Mastrangelo was lead vocalist for, "The Endless Pulse", recording three uncharted singles for Laurie Records. Subsequent releases included the bubblegum rock, Ernie Maresca produced, "Shoo-Fly Pie & Apple Pan Dowdy" on Tower Records, followed by a progressive version of the Peggy Lee classic "Fever", and "Let There Be Love" on the Raftis label.

In the early 1970s, Mastrangelo sang lead, played drums, percussion, and kazoo for the jazz-rock ensemble, "Pulse" (initially known as The Endless Pulse). Members included Kenny Sambolin, Richie Goggin, Bill Golden, and Chris Gentile. In late 1971, they recorded the LP; "Pulse-featuring Carlo Mastrangelo", later released in 1972 on the small Thimble label. Most of the material on the ten-track album was written by Mastrangelo, with an emphasis placed on organ and fuzz guitar. The LP is noted for being one of the few hard rock albums featuring a kazoo solo, and stands up well as a fine progressive rock composition.

After Pulse disbanded, he formed and sang lead for The Midnite Sun, a popular New York City area nightclub band. Members included Kenny Sambolin - bass guitar, Bobby Coleman - lead guitar, Judy Purse - singer, and his cousin Joey DeMaria on drums. That later changed to Carlo on drums and Charlie Carlisi on lead guitar.

After recording the jazz-rock album, Mastrangelo, D'Aleo, Milano, and DiMucci reunited in New York City on June 2, 1972, for a Richard Nader "Rock and Roll Revival" concert. The live performance, recorded by Warner Brothers, was titled, "Dion and The Belmonts – Reunion: Live at Madison Square Garden 1972". The following year, all four original members did another reunion concert at the Nassau Coliseum on Long Island, NY, with no recording ever being issued.

Although no longer an official member of the Belmonts, Mastrangelo did backing vocals on all nine tracks of the Belmonts' album, "Cigars, Acappella, Candy", released by Buddah Records in 1972. He also sang lead vocals on the songs, "Loving You Is Sweeter Than Ever", and "We Belong Together". The LP received many favorable reviews, being distinguished for its medley of 13 four-part harmony tracks titled "Street Corner Symphony". Their doo-wop version of, "Da Doo Ron Ron", even received considerable airplay on progressive rock station WLIR.

Mastrangelo lived in Boynton Beach, Florida, minutes away from Dion DiMucci. The two former lead singers of The Belmonts continued to collaborate on many of DiMucci's recordings and live performances from the 1980s until Mastrangelo's death in April 2016 at the age of 78.

Discography

Singles by label
Mohawk Records
 Teen-age Clementine / Santa Margherita (1957) - The Belmonts
 Tag Along / We Went Away (1957) - Dion with the Belmonts

Laurie Records
 I Wonder Why / Teen Angel (1958) - Dion and the Belmonts
 No One Knows / I Cant Go On (Rosalie) (1958) - Dion and the Belmonts
 Don't Pity Me / Just You (1958) - Dion and the Belmonts
 A Teenager In Love / I've Cried Before (1959) - Dion and the Belmonts
 Every Little Thing I Do / A Lover's Prayer (1959) - Dion and the Belmonts
 Where Or When / That's My Desire (1960) - Dion and the Belmonts
 When You Wish Upon A Star / Wonderful Girl (1960) - Dion and the Belmonts
 In The Still Of The Night / A Funny Feeling (1960) - Dion and the Belmonts
 Rockin' Rocket / Happy Tune (instrumentals)(1960) - Carlo and Jimmy 
 We Belong Together / Such A Long Way (1961) - The Belmonts
 Baby Doll / Write Me A Letter (1962) - Carlo
 Little Orphan Girl / Mairzy Doats (1963) - Carlo
 Five Minutes More / Story Of Love (1963) - Carlo
 Ring-A-Ling / Stranger In My Arms (1964) - Carlo
 Donna Lee / Um Ba Pa (1964) - The Demilles
 Time Is Wastin' / Ghost Man (1968) - The Endless Pulse
 You Turned Me Over / Just You (1968) - The Endless Pulse
 Nowhere Chick / Wake Me, Shake Me (1969) - The Endless Pulse

Sabrina/Sabina Records
 Tell Me Why / Smoke From Your Cigarette (1961) - The Belmonts
 Don't Get Around Much Anymore / Searching For A New Love (1961) - The Belmonts
 I Need Someone / That American Dance (1961) - The Belmonts
 I Confess / Hombre (1962) - The Belmonts
 Come On Little Angel / How About Me (1962) - The Belmonts

Columbia Records
 Tomorrow Won't Bring The Rain / You Move Me Babe (1965) - Dion and the Wanderers
 Time in My Heart For You / Wake Up Baby (1965) - Dion and the Wanderers
 Two Ton Feather / So Much Younger (1966) - Dion and the Wanderers
 I Can't Help But Wonder Where I'm Bound / Southern Train (1969) - Dion and the Wanderers

ABC Records
 My Girl The Month of May / Berimbau (1966) - Dion and the Belmonts
 Movin' Man / For Bobbie (1967) - Dion and the Belmonts

Tower Records
 Shoo-Fly Pie & Apple Pan Dowdy / It's Alright (1969) - Carlo's Crown Jewel

Raftis Records
 Fever / Claudine (1970) - Carlo
 Let There Be Love / same (1970) - Carlo

Thimble Records
 Why Can't She See Me / same (1972) - Pulse

LPs
 Presenting Dion and the Belmonts (1959) - Laurie Records
 Wish Upon A Star with Dion and the Belmonts (1960) - Laurie Records
 Together Again (1967) - Dion and the Belmonts - ABC Records
 Summer Love (1969) - The Belmonts - Dot Records
 Cigars Acappella Candy (1972) - The Belmonts - Buddah Records
 Pulse featuring Carlo Mastrangelo (1972) - Thimble Records
 Reunion (1973) - Dion and the Belmonts - Warner Brothers Records

References

External links
 The Belmonts official website

1937 births
2016 deaths
American rock singers
American people of Italian descent
American male pop singers
Musicians from the Bronx
Laurie Records artists
Singers from New York City
Dion and the Belmonts members
Doo-wop musicians